The Year's Best Science Fiction: Twenty-Seventh Annual Collection is a science fiction anthology edited by Gardner Dozois that was published on July 6, 2010.  It is the 27th in The Year's Best Science Fiction series. It was also published in the UK as The Mammoth Book of Best New SF 23.

Contents
The book includes 32 stories, all first published in 2009. The book also includes a summation by Dozois, a brief introduction to each story by Dozois and a referenced list of honorable mentions for the year. The stories are as follows:

Robert Charles Wilson: "Utriusque Cosmi"
Steven Gould: "A Story, With Beans"
Karl Bunker: "Under The Shouting Sky"
John Kessel: "Events Preceding the Helvetican Revolution"
Maureen F. McHugh: "Useless Things"
Bruce Sterling: "Black Swan"
Paul McAuley: "Crimes and Glory"
Alexander Irvine: "Seventh Fall"
Dominic Green: "Butterfly Bomb"
Vandana Singh: "Infinites"
John Barnes: "Things Undone"
Jay Lake: "On The Human Plan"
Peter Watts: "The Island"
Lavie Tidhar: "The Integrity of the Chain"
Mary Rosenblum: "Lion Walk"
Jo Walton: "Escape to Other Worlds with Science Fiction"
Rand B. Lee: "Three Leaves of Aloe"
Elizabeth Bear & Sarah Monette: "Mongoose"
Albert E. Cowdrey: "Paradiso Lost"
Nicola Griffith: "It Takes Two"
Geoff Ryman: "Blocked"
James Van Pelt: "Solace"
Nancy Kress: "Act One"
John C. Wright: "Twilight of the Gods"
Ted Kosmatka & Michael Poore: "Blood Dauber"
Damien Broderick: "This Wind Blowing, And This Tide"
Adam Roberts: "Hair"
Robert Reed: "Before My Last Breath"
Paul Cornell: "One of Our Bastards Is Missing"
Chris Roberson: "Edison's Frankenstein"
Ian Creasey: "Erosion"
Ian McDonald: "Vishnu at the Cat Circus"

Release Details
 2010, United States, St. Martin's Press , Pub date July 2010, Hardcover 
 2010, United States, St. Martin's Griffin , Pub date July 2010, Trade paperback

References

External links
 
Review at Wall Street Journal

2010 anthologies
2010s science fiction works
27
St. Martin's Press books